The Gamesa G128-4.5 MW wind turbine, from Gamesa, near Jaulín, Zaragoza, Spain, is a wind turbine with the largest rotor, which surpasses with  that of the Enercon E-126 by . It is the prototype of this model. The turbine has a generation power of 4.5 MW.

References

External links 
 Gamesa Presents G10X-4.5 MW Wind Turbine Prototype

Wind turbines